The 2000–01 Men's EuroFloorball Cup Qualifying rounds took place over 10 to 11 August 2000 in Prague, Czech Republic. The top 2 teams advanced to the 2000–01 Men's EuroFloorball Cup Finals where they had a chance to win the EuroFloorball Cup for 2000–01.

Only 3 teams attended the 2000–01 Qualifying Rounds, as a fourth team from Hungary was forced to pull out due to some unforeseen circumstances.

The 2000–01 EuroFloorball Cup marked the first year in which the International Floorball Federation changed the format to a two-year tournament.

The tournament was known as the 2000–01 Men's European Cup, but due to name implications, is now known as the 2000–01 Men's EuroFloorball Cup.

Results

See also
2000–01 Men's EuroFloorball Cup Finals

External links
Standings & Statistics

EuroFloorball Cup
Mens Eurofloorball Cup Qualifying, 2000-01